Hind Ben Abdelkader (born July 7, 1995) is a Belgium professional basketball player who plays for the ESB Villeneuve-d'Ascq in the Ligue Féminine de Basketball. She is also a member of the Belgium women's national basketball team.

Professional career

WNBA
Ben Abdelkader went undrafted in the 2017 WNBA draft. She was signed by the Indiana Fever in 2018 to a training camp contract and made the opening day roster. Ben Abdelkader was waived by the Fever in July, when they signed veteran guard Cappie Pondexter.

She made another attempt at the WNBA in 2019 when she signed a training camp contract with the Chicago Sky. She didn't make the final squad, as she was waived at the end of training camp.

WNBA career statistics

Regular season

|-
| align="left" | 2018
| align="left" | Indiana
| 14 || 0 || 10.1 || .186 || .207 || .875 || 1.0 || 0.8 || 0.3 || 0.1 || 0.9 || 2.1
|-
| align="left" | Career
| align="left" | 1 year, 1 team
| 14 || 0 || 10.1 || .186 || .207 || .875 || 1.0 || 0.8 || 0.3 || 0.1 || 0.9 || 2.1

College career
Ben Abdelkader decided to join the California Golden Bears women's basketball team for the 2013-2014 season. During February of her freshman season, Ben Abdelkader announced she was leaving California and returning to Belgium.

References

External links
WNBA bio

1995 births
Living people
Belgian women's basketball players
Guards (basketball)
California Golden Bears women's basketball players
Indiana Fever players
Belgian expatriate basketball people in France
Belgian expatriate basketball people in Russia
Belgian expatriate basketball people in the United States